Malumalu is a volcanic seamount in American Samoa.

The seamount is a young volcano at the eastern end of a lineament that begins on Tutuila. This lineament has been named the "Malu trend" (in contrast to the "Vai trend" farther northeast, which runs between Ofu, Ta'u and Vailulu'u). This is comparable to the "Kea" and "Loa" trends in Hawaii. Malumalu is not much older than Vailulu'u, which has erupted in historical time. Actinide isotope ratios indicate the occurrence of at least three volcanic events in the last 300,000 years, including at least two in the last 150,000 years and at least one in the last 8,000 years. According to one model of the behaviour of the Samoa hotspot, volcanic activity at Malumalu will decline in the next 10,000 - 100,000 years as the mantle plume is pushed farther northeast to Vailulu'u by mantle flow generated by the Tonga slab.

References

Sources 

 
 
 

Holocene volcanoes
Seamounts of the Pacific Ocean
Volcanoes of American Samoa